John Dickinson (10 April 1934 – 7 August 2021), also known by the nickname of "Todder", was an English professional rugby league footballer who played in the 1950s, and coached in the 1960s.

Playing career

International honours
John 'Todder' Dickinson won a cap for England while at St. Helens in 1956 against France.

County Cup Final appearances
John 'Todder' Dickinson played  in St. Helens' 3–10 defeat by Oldham in the 1956 Lancashire County Cup Final during the 1956–57 season at Central Park, Wigan on Saturday 20 October 1956.

Personal life
Dickinson died on 7 August 2021, at the age of 87.

References

External links
 
Profile at saints.org.uk

1934 births
2021 deaths
England national rugby league team players
English rugby league coaches
English rugby league players
Leigh Leopards players
Pilkington Recs coaches
Rochdale Hornets players
Rugby league centres
Rugby league five-eighths
Rugby league fullbacks
Rugby league halfbacks
Rugby league players from St Helens, Merseyside
Rugby league wingers
St Helens R.F.C. players